Exile is the seventh studio album by the American country pop group of the same name. It was released in 1984 via Epic Records. The album includes the singles "High Cost of Leaving", "Woke Up in Love" and "I Don't Want to Be a Memory".

Track listing

Chart performance

References

1983 albums
Exile (American band) albums
Epic Records albums